Craig Branch (born 11 February 1977) is an Australian alpine skier.  He competed for Australia at the 2002 Olympics, 2006 Olympics and the 2010 Olympics.  His best result was 27th place in the Super G at the 2002 Olympics.

References

External links

Living people
Alpine skiers at the 2002 Winter Olympics
Alpine skiers at the 2006 Winter Olympics
Alpine skiers at the 2010 Winter Olympics
Australian male alpine skiers
Olympic alpine skiers of Australia
1977 births